Zijad Arslanagić (April 18, 1936 – January 7, 2020) was a Bosnian football player. He had one cap for the Yugoslav national team.

Club career
After beginning to play in a minor local club in his home town, FK Gimnazijalac, he signed with the city's most prominent club FK Leotar where he played between 1953 and 1956. In 1956 he moved because of the military service to Zemun, and afterwards, for a short while, he played with local club FK IM Rakovica. In 1958 he began playing for FK Sarajevo and played with them in the Yugoslav First League until 1964 when he moved to NK Olimpija Ljubljana. In 1967, he moved abroad and played one season with Belgian First Division club K. Beringen F.C. and in the next year he moved to Germany and played with Tasmania 1900 Berlin before retiring.

International career
He played one match for the Yugoslav national team in the 1966 FIFA World Cup qualifications on November 7, 1965 in Belgrade against Norway, a 1-1 draw.

References

External links
 
 Career story at Reprezentacija.rs.

1936 births
2020 deaths
People from Trebinje
Association football forwards
Yugoslav footballers
Bosnia and Herzegovina footballers
Yugoslavia international footballers
FK Leotar players
FK Sarajevo players
NK Olimpija Ljubljana (1945–2005) players
K. Beringen F.C. players
SC Tasmania 1900 Berlin players
Yugoslav Second League players
Yugoslav First League players
Belgian Pro League players
2. Bundesliga players
Yugoslav expatriate footballers
Expatriate footballers in Belgium
Yugoslav expatriate sportspeople in Belgium
Expatriate footballers in Germany
Yugoslav expatriate sportspeople in Germany